Alpinia malaccensis is a plant in the family Zingiberaceae cultivated for ornamental and medicinal purposes. It is a native of Indonesia and Malaysia. An oil is obtained from dried rhizome. It has many medicinal properties.

References

External links
 Places where seen
 Details

malaccensis
Medicinal plants of Asia
Taxa named by Nicolaas Laurens Burman